Soole (English translation: Cheap Ride) is a 2021 Nigerian-comedy film produced by Adunni Ade, a Lou-Ellen Clara Company Limited distributed by FilmOne entertainment, and directed by Kayode Kasum. The film is Adunni Ade's debut production and stars Sola Sobowale, Lateef Adedimeji, Femi Jacobs, Meg Otanwa, Shawn Faqua, Bukunmi Oluwasina, Eso Dike, Teniola Aladese, Saidi Balogun amongst others. The film premiered on the 21 November 2021 and hit cinemas nationwide on 26 November 2021.

Selected cast 
 Adunni Ade as Sister Veronica
 Lateef Adedimeji as John
 Teniola Aladese as Clara
 Femi Jacobs as Ifebuchi
 Meg Otanwa as Justina
 Sola Sobowale as Ifeoma
 Bukunmi Oluwasina
 Saidi Balogun
 Eso Dike

Synopsis 
Soole is a story of a Catholic nun named Veronica played by Adunni Ade who travels from Lagos to Enugu after failing to fund an orphanage home, in her journey to Enugu, she opted for a cheap option ride popularly called 'Soole' where she met different commuters like herself. The journey from Lagos to Enugu featured a lot of drama including an armed robbery attack on their way to Enugu.

Premiere 
The premiere took place at the Filmhouse Cinemas IMAX Lekki in Lagos on the 21st, of November 2021. The event featured several celebrities including those that didn't appear in the movie, some of the celebrities present were Kehinde Bankole, Shawn Faqua, Okey Bakassi and a host of others.

Nomination and recognition 
Shawn Faqua was nominated for his role in the Soole movie under the category for Best actor in a comedy (Movie/TV series) at the 2022 Africa Magic Viewers' Choice Awards.

References 

2021 comedy films
English-language Nigerian films
Nigerian comedy films
2020s English-language films
Films set in Nigeria